Dan Fredenburgh is a British actor and screenwriter known for The Bourne Ultimatum (2007), Love Actually (2003) and the role of John Knightley in the BBC's adaptation of Emma (2009).

Since graduating from The Arts Educational School, he has worked in film, theatre and television for more than 20 years.

As a screenwriter, Fredenburgh has written a number of feature and TV projects. Notably, the film Broken Lines., starring Paul Bettany, Doraly Rosa and Olivia Williams, which was selected for the Venice Film Festival and London Film Festival and nominated for the FIPRESCI Critics’ Prize. He currently  has a number of projects in development.

Personal life
He was raised on a commune. Since the age of 10 he has been a confirmed North Londoner.

In 2002, he received an Ian Charleson Award commendation for his work in the title role of the Royal Shakespeare Company production of The Prince Of Homburg

Partial filmography
Brothers (2000) as Julian Davidson "The King"
Al's Lads (2002) 
Love Actually (2003) as Jamie's Bad Brother 
Land of the Blind (2006) 
The Bourne Ultimatum (2007) as Jimmy
Broken Lines (2008) as Jake
Kicking Off (2015)

Television
The Knock (1994)
Queen of Swords (2001)
Sword of Honour (2001)
Bad Girls (2001)
Lexx (2002)
Doctors (2002)
The Bill (2003-2007)
Waking The Dead (2005)
Donovan (2005-2006)
Silent Witness (2007)
Ashes to Ashes (2008)
Emma (2009) as John Knightley
Casualty (2007-2011)
Father Brown (2013)
Spies of Warsaw (2013)
Holby City (2003-2013)
Love Matters (2003-2013)
The Tunnel (2013)
The Missing (2014)
The Evermoor Chronicles (2014)
Doctors (2020) as Jason Farnham

Radio

Tender Is The Night - BBC Radio 4

External links

UK Jewish Film: Broken Lines
Metro (2008) British film screened at festival

References

Year of birth missing (living people)
Living people
21st-century British male actors
British screenwriters
British male film actors
British male stage actors
British male television actors